Charmshahr is a village in Behnamarab-e Jonubi Rural District, Javadabad District, Varamin County, Tehran Province, Iran. At the 2006 census, its population was 251, in 119 families.

References 

Populated places in Varamin County